The Xihoumen Bridge is a suspension bridge on the Zhoushan Archipelago, the largest offshore island group in China.

Linking Jintang and Cezi islands, the bridge, together with the 27-kilometer cable-stayed Jintang Bridge linking Jintang and Zhenhai in the neighboring city of Ningbo, is part of the second and last phase of a bridging project started in 1999 to connect the Zhoushan Archipelago to the mainland via five bridges. The bridge forms part of the Yongzhou Expressway.

Built by the province of Zhejiang at a cost of 2.48 billion yuan (approximately US$363 million), construction began in 2005 and the main span was completed in December 2007. The bridge was opened to traffic on a test basis on 25 December 2009, at 11:58 p.m., local time alongside the Jintang Bridge, before it is officially open for traffic. The opening date was delayed due to a ship collision on 16 November 2009 that slightly damaged the side of Jintang Bridge.

The 5.3-kilometre suspension bridge connection has a 2.6-kilometre main bridge with a central span of 1,650 metres. The approaches total 2.7 kilometres. When built, it was the second-longest suspension bridge ranked by the length of the centre span after the Akashi Kaikyō Bridge in Japan.

See also
 List of bridges in China
 List of longest suspension bridge spans

Notes

External links

 Xihoumen bridge images and location at Google Earth

 diagrams and artist's depiction
 Official announcement in People's Daily

Suspension bridges in China
Bridges completed in 2007
Bridges in Zhoushan
Cross-sea bridges in China